Plieščanicy is an urban-type settlement in the northern part of Belarus. It is located in the Lahoysk District of the Minsk Region, 60 km to the north of Minsk.

Nature 
Plieščanicy has an elevation of 211 m (692 ft) above sea level. The topography of the surrounding area is relatively flat and sparsely populated. Plieščanicy is the largest settlement in the area, with a population of 5,835 inhabitants.

See also
 Urban-type settlements in Belarus
 Lahoysk District

References

Populated places in Minsk Region

Lahoysk District
Minsk Voivodeship